Jasper Redd (born June 9, 1979) is an American comedian from  Knoxville, Tennessee.

Jasper's brand of comedy is distinguished by his use of polyrhythmic timing.  Earlier in his career, this was more pronounced.  However, he currently is using more traditional cadences to appeal to a wider audience.

With fellow comedian Kimberly Clark, Redd co-hosts the podcast "The Goosedown" on the Maximum Fun network.

He has appeared on Last Call with Carson Daly, Lopez Tonight, Def Comedy Jam,  Tosh.0, Jordan, Jesse, Go!, Last Comic Standing, and in the movie National Lampoon's Totally Baked: A Potumentary.

He previously toured nationwide supporting Daniel Tosh on his Tosh Tour Twenty Ten.

References

 Jasper Redd's MySpace Profile
Jasper Redd Fansite
Cringe Humor - The West Coast Report: 1-26-04 Just For Laughs
Comedy Central - Jasper Redd
UC Santa Cruz - KZSC Laugh Riot

African-American male comedians
American male comedians
21st-century American comedians
American stand-up comedians
Living people
1979 births
21st-century African-American people
20th-century African-American people